The Aberdeen and Rockfish Railroad  is a short-line railroad operating in North Carolina.  At one time the AR was a Class 2 railroad.  The railroad has  of track that runs from Aberdeen to Fayetteville, North Carolina.

History
The AR was incorporated in 1892 by businessman John Blue. He built the railroad to get his timber and turpentine products to market. On June 30, 1895, the first stretch of road was opened from Aberdeen to Endon. In 1898 the company added a line from Ashley Heights to Raeford which soon became the main line with the Endon line as a branch. Shortly thereafter, the Endon branch was extended to Juniper. The main line was extended to Dundarrach in 1900, Rockfish in 1902, Fenix in 1904 and a branch from Rockfish to Hope Mills was added in 1905. For a while, Aberdeen–Hope Mills became the main line, with branches to Juniper and Fenix.

On November 14, 1909, another branch from Raeford to Wagram was opened. In 1912, the company abandoned the Endon branch and used the rails to construct an extension from Fenix to Fayetteville which opened on December 23 that year. At the same time the line to Hope Mills was abandoned, as it became unnecessary with the new link to the main line of the Atlantic Coast Line Railroad in Fayetteville. Over the years the railroad's traffic has shifted from lumber to agriculture products. The AR is still owned by the Blue family and operates freight trains from Aberdeen to Fayetteville. The Wagram branch was sold to the Laurinburg and Southern Railroad in 1921. Passenger service ended in 1949.

Traffic
Chemicals
Animal Feed
Grain
Animal By-Products
Building Supplies
Fertilizer Solution

Route

M.P. 00 Aberdeen, North Carolina - interchange with CSX (former SAL) and Aberdeen, Carolina and Western Railway (ACWR) and NS (former Southern Rwy, previously Norfolk & Southern RR).
Spivey Hill Siding
M.P. 05 Ashley Heights, North Carolina (abandoned AR branch (8 miles) used to run east to Endon and Juniper)
McCain
M.P. 10 Montrose
M.P. 13 Timberland
M.P. 19 Raeford, North Carolina - interchange with Laurinburg and Southern Railroad (LRS) that runs over former AR track to Edinburgh, Purcell and Wagram, North Carolina (12 miles).
Upchurch Siding
M.P. 24 Dundarrach, North Carolina
M.P. 26 Arabia, North Carolina
M.P. 30 Rockfish, North Carolina
M.P. 31 Hope Mills Junction (abandoned AR branch that used to run east to Hope Mills, NC)
M.P. 34 Fenix
M.P. 36 Cliffdale - former junction with branch to Clifbragg (former Cape Fear Railways route)
M.P. 40 Skibo - former junction with abandoned track of Cape Fear Railways (CF)(Route to Fort Bragg)
M.P. 42 Owens
M.P. 45 South Fayetteville, North Carolina CSX (former ACL) AND NS (former Norfolk & Southern RR)
River Terminal (on Cape Fear River)

Fleet
The Aberdeen and Rockfish fleet, as of July 2011, consists of 6 locomotives, all originally built by EMD:

See also

Laurinburg and Southern Railroad

Notes

References

Further reading

External links

 
 Aberdeen & Rockfish: Past & Present Motive Power
 HawkinsRails.net Aberdeen & Rockfish collection

North Carolina railroads
Railway companies established in 1892
American companies established in 1892